Hardt is a German surname. Notable people with the surname include:

Dick Hardt (born 1963), American-Canadian Software Executive
Ernst Hardt (1876–1947), German author
Jürgen Hardt (born 1963), German politician
Michael Hardt (born 1960), American philosopher

German-language surnames